The New Batman Adventures (often shortened as TNBA) is an American superhero animated television series based on the DC Comics superhero Batman, which aired on Kids' WB from September 13, 1997 to January 16, 1999. Produced by Warner Bros. Animation, it is a continuation of Batman: The Animated Series (1992-1995), serving as the third season of the show and the third series in the DC Animated Universe. It was followed by Batman Beyond (1999-2001). The series had a revamp, replacing the older animation style of its predecessor so as to maintain similarity and continuity with the simultaneously running Superman: The Animated Series (1996-2000), with episodes airing on Kids' WB under the title The New Batman/Superman Adventures. 

Stories in this series tend to give more focus to Batman's supporting cast, which include fellow crimefighters Robin, Nightwing and Batgirl, among others. The show also features guest stars such as Supergirl, Etrigan the Demon and The Creeper, characters who would later appear with Batman in Justice League and Justice League Unlimited. The 2001 video game Batman: Vengeance and its follow-up Batman: Rise of Sin Tzu are based on this series.

Overview
The New Batman Adventures premiered on Kids' WB just two years after Batman: The Animated Series ended its original run on Fox Kids. The animation style was changed significantly from BTAS (to match that of Superman: The Animated Series) and the show had a significant change in focus from the original series, with episodes focusing less on Batman and more on the many characters that inhabited Gotham City. The art became more streamlined and darker with simpler color schemes, while the Art Deco and film noir imagery from the original series were replaced with a more modern look.

Batman was given a sleeker, brawnier appearance with an overall darker costume: the yellow ellipse surrounding the bat emblem on his chest and the blue highlights of his cape and cowl were both removed and his utility belt has pouches instead of capsules and is now light brown instead of yellow, which resembles his appearance in Batman: Year One. His gadgets and vehicles were given a sleeker, redesigned look with a more black color scheme. Bruce Wayne's appearance was also changed from the previous series: his hair was brushed back to highlight his face, with blue eyes instead of black, and his regular business suit was changed from brown to black. Kevin Conroy's voice for Batman became more stern, as well as less distinguishable from his voice for Bruce than in the original series. The writers made an effort to keep Batman's dialogue as terse and grim as possible, in order to heighten the contrast between him and the lighthearted supporting cast, this also highlighted his character change from the original series (being more compassionate and optimistic) to this one (being stern, cold and blunt).

Batgirl's costume was changed to a look similar to her original outfit from her comic debut in Detective Comics #359 and in her appearance in the Silver Age of comics, which is now a black bodysuit with yellow gloves and boots, but keeps her blue cape and cowl and yellow bat-symbol and utility belt. Her father Commissioner Gordon's appearance was also altered, with a more slender build and a flat-top hairstyle. Producer Paul Dini said that Batgirl would appear in every episode of the new series because "Kenner wants to do a line of toys, we're taking advantage of the publicity from her being in Batman & Robin, and we just love Batgirl". In addition, Melissa Gilbert was replaced by Tara Strong (credited under her maiden name Tara Charendoff) as the voice of Batgirl. While Batgirl did not actually appear in every episode, she did appear more often than Batman's other partners in the series. She also was Batman's main partner in the series rather than Robin, which differs the series from most Batman television series and in the comics (as Robin is usually Batman's main partner). Strong would reprise her role over a decade later in another Batman animated television series, Beware the Batman, and also on the DC Nation short Super Best Friends Forever, Teen Titans Go!, DC Super Hero Girls and in the animated feature Batman: The Killing Joke, which reunited her with Conroy and Mark Hamill.

Tim Drake was introduced as the new Robin in the episode "Sins of the Father". However, Dini remarked that "the Tim Drake origin in the comics as written now didn't work for us with him having a father and living so close to Wayne Manor. It seemed to work fine in the comics, but we needed our own little family unit of Batman, Robin, Batgirl and occasionally Nightwing – and Alfred of course". For these reasons, the production team came up with their own origin for Tim Drake, though they later realized this new origin was extremely similar to Jason Todd's. Dini and Timm later revealed that the new Robin was always intended to have Jason's origin story and characteristics of both Jason and Tim. The decision to implement some of Todd's characteristics on Drake came up after Timm and Dini decided to not adapt the violent "Batman: A Death in the Family" comic book storyline for the show. Batman made a new suit which is similar to the first one worn by Dick Grayson and identical to Tim Drake's original Robin costume from the comics, but the color scheme was simplified to red, black and yellow, eliminating green entirely. The costume retained the familiar red short-sleeved shirt, as well as the black cape with yellow inner lining. New elements included black sleeves, gloves, trunks and boots with red leggings. The familiar domino mask had also changed, giving the new Robin a more wide-eyed, innocent look. The color scheme would later appear as Tim Drake's Robin costume in the post-Infinite Crisis comics, while the original costume worn by Dick Grayson was seen in the flashback sequence of "Old Wounds" and in Barbara's nightmare sequence of "Over the Edge" where it is seen in the costume display before it gets destroyed by the Gotham Police.

Dick Grayson, having abandoned his Robin persona as a result of a falling out with Batman, adopted the identity of Nightwing. Grayson's build became sleeker, with broader shoulders, showcasing his emergence as a mature hero in his own right. The short spiky hair that Grayson wore as Robin had grown longer, styled to flow down the back of the neck. In his civilian guise, he wore it in a ponytail. As Nightwing, he wore a V-shaped mask and an all-black unitard with light blue hawk emblem that borrowed some elements of the comics version from the 1990s. The costume also featured collapsible wings under the arms that allowed Nightwing to glide for short distances.

The designs of most of the villains from Batman's rogues' gallery were also changed considerably, generally developing darker color schemes. The most controversial of the redesigns was that of the Joker, whose white skin now had a bluish-gray tinge, while the eyes had their scleras removed and were replaced by cavernous black spaces with white pupils. The ruby-red lips were gone, focusing more attention on the teeth, and the green-tinged hair was almost completely black. His flower pin color lighter orange was replaced with lime-green. His primary suit colors were changed from purple and orange (similar to his appearance from the 1989 Batman movie) to purple and green (similar to his appearance from the Golden Age and Silver Age comics), Joker's redesign was not well-received by fans and this led to him being redesigned again for Batman Beyond: Return of the Joker (2000), Static Shock (2002) and Justice League (2002–04), where his appearance was a mix of his look from the original series and this one. Catwoman also received a major redesign, as she now sports an all-black bodysuit (similar to her appearance from Batman Returns) and her hair is changed from blonde and shoulder-length to short and black while keeping her green eyes, matching her appearance in the comics. The Penguin's appearance has also changed, now resembling his appearance from the Golden Age and Silver Age comics instead of having the animal-like appearance from Batman Returns. The Riddler's appearance is also redesigned, now sporting a green bodysuit with a question mark in the center and his domino mask and red hair are removed, while his bowler hat is retained. The Scarecrow receives a big change, as he now has long black hair, black hat and dark gray trenchcoat and his face becomes dead-like. In addition, Henry Polic II was replaced by Jeffrey Combs as the voice of the Scarecrow. Mr. Freeze's appearance also received a drastic change, his suit is now black with metallic blue accents and his goggles have disappeared with his head now attached to a spider-like robot. Poison Ivy's appearance also changed, her skin tone is chalk white and her costume is now black with leaf-green highlights. Bane also gains a major change, his outfit is completely black with silver accents and his mask no longer has red lenses. Killer Croc received a major redesign, his skin is now reptilian green and his pants are now a blue-gray color. In addition, Aron Kincaid was replaced by Brooks Gardner as the voice of Killer Croc.

Harley Quinn, Two-Face, Clayface, Alfred Pennyworth, and Harvey Bullock were among the few characters who did not receive any drastic change in appearance or color alterations. Harley Quinn is also the only villain aside from the Joker who appeared in six or more episodes. Ra's al Ghul and his daughter Talia also did not receive any drastic re-designs, although their only appearance during this time was in the episode "The Demon Reborn" from Superman: The Animated Series.

Koko Enterprise Co., LTD., TMS-Kyokuchi Corporation, and Dong Yang Animation Co., LTD contributed some of the animation for this series.

During the series, Bruce Timm and his crew began using TMS-Kyokuchi Corporation as an outsourced pre-production unit as well as an animation unit, and TMS storyboarded and directed episodes themselves.

The Kids' WB censors were much more flexible with episode content than the Fox Kids censors were with Batman: The Animated Series. Producer Bruce Timm recounted that "when we were at Fox, after every single storyboard, we would get five single-spaced pages of notes on things we couldn't do. On the WB, we usually get maybe two paragraphs of stuff we can't do. At Fox, they were really picky, not just about things you couldn't do, but just in terms of content and story. They had a million opinions about what we should be doing. Nobody bothers us like that at the WB".

Episodes

Cast

Protagonists

Supporting protagonists

Antagonists

Supporting antagonists

Home media

On December 6, 2005, The New Batman Adventures was released onto DVD by Warner Home Video (via DC Entertainment and Warner Bros. Family Entertainment) under the title of Batman: The Animated Series - Volume Four (from The New Batman Adventures) to coincide with the previous three-volume DVD sets of Batman: The Animated Series. The series was released a second time on November 4, 2008, as part of a DVD release entitled Batman: The Complete Animated Series, which contained the episodes of all four volumes that were released in 2004/2005. The series has also been released for online media distribution services such as iTunes and Google Play specifically as "Season/Volume 4" of the complete animated series when the original two-season animated series was broken out differently into three seasons. The series was released on Blu-ray as part of Batman: The Complete Series in the fall of 2018.

It is subsumed as Season 3 of the original series when it debuted on HBO Max on January 1, 2021.

Feature films
 Batman: Mystery of the Batwoman (2003), a direct-to-video release

Video games
Batman: Vengeance, published by Ubisoft for the Game Boy Advance, PlayStation 2, GameCube, and Xbox consoles as well as Microsoft Windows; featuring the Joker, Harley Quinn, Mr. Freeze, and Poison Ivy as antagonists
Batman: Rise of Sin Tzu, the sequel to Batman Vengeance, which featured a new villain created specially for the game, Sin Tzu
Batman: Chaos in Gotham, a platforming action video game for the Game Boy Color
Batman: Gotham City Racer, a racing game for the PlayStation

Books
Capstone publishes children's chapter books containing illustrations with character designs from TNBA.

Awards and nominations

See also

Chase Me, a short silent film released as a bonus feature on the DVD of Batman: Mystery of the Batwoman
Gotham Girls, Warner Bros' official series of Flash animations using many of the characters from the television series

References

External links

 
 DC page
The New Batman Adventures at Big Cartoon DataBase
 
 The New Batman Adventures at The World's Finest
 The New Batman Adventures at DCAU Wiki

 
Animated Batman television series
1990s American animated television series
1997 American television series debuts
1999 American television series endings
The WB original programming
Kids' WB original shows
American sequel television series
Animated television shows based on DC Comics
Television series by Warner Bros. Animation
American children's animated action television series
American children's animated adventure television series
American children's animated superhero television series
Television series about organized crime
Television shows adapted into video games